I Am Gemini is the seventh studio album by the post-hardcore band Cursive. It was released in 2012 on Saddle Creek Records in the US and Big Scary Monsters in the UK.

Track listing

References

External links
Cursive official website
Saddle Creek Records

2012 albums
Cursive (band) albums
Saddle Creek Records albums
Big Scary Monsters Recording Company albums
Albums produced by Matt Bayles